Commander John Tapling Fremantle, 5th Baron Cottesloe, 6th Baron Fremantle,  (22 January 1927 – 21 May 2018) was a British baron in the Peerage of the United Kingdom.

Biography

Early life

John Fremantle was born on 22 January 1927, the son of John Walgrave Halford Fremantle, 4th Baron Cottesloe (1900–1994) and Lady Elizabeth Harris, daughter of James Edward Harris, 5th Earl of Malmesbury and Dorothy Gough-Calthorpe. Both his parents were descendants of American Loyalist members of the Dutch Schuyler and Van Cortlandt families of British North America.

Fremantle was educated at Summer Fields School and Eton College.

Career
He followed the family tradition set by his ancestor Admiral Thomas Fremantle and joined the Royal Navy in 1945. He commanded HMS Palliser between 1959 and 1961, retiring from the Navy in 1966 with the rank of Commander. He was High Sheriff of Buckinghamshire in 1969.

He inherited on the death of his father in 1994 the British peerage title Baron Cottesloe. He also inherited the Austrian noble title "Baron Fremantle", which was an authorized title in the United Kingdom for his lifetime by Warrant of 27 April 1932. He was Lord-Lieutenant of Buckinghamshire between 1984 and 1997.

A justice of the peace for Buckinghamshire from 1984, he resided at Swanbourne, where he was commonly referred to as 'The Commander'.

Personal life
He married Elizabeth Ann Barker, daughter of Lt.-Colonel Henry Shelly Barker, on 26 April 1958. They had two daughters and one son:

 Hon. Elizabeth Wynne Fremantle (b. 15 February 1959)
 Hon. Frances Ann Fremantle (b. 7 June 1961)
 Thomas Henry Fremantle, 6th Baron Cottesloe (b. 17 March 1966)

He was the father-in-law of Iain Duncan Smith, who is married to his daughter, Elizabeth "Betsy" Fremantle, and they have four children.

He died on 21 May 2018 at the age of 91.

References

External links
Biography

of the Austrian Empire

1927 births
2018 deaths
Barons in the Peerage of the United Kingdom
English justices of the peace
High Sheriffs of Buckinghamshire
Knights of the Order of St John
Lord-Lieutenants of Buckinghamshire
People educated at Eton College
People educated at Summer Fields School
People from Aylesbury Vale
Royal Navy officers
British people of Dutch descent
Gough-Calthorpe family
Schuyler family
Van Cortlandt family
Eldest sons of British hereditary barons
Barons of Austria

Cottesloe